Črešnjice is a settlement northwest of Otočec in the City Municipality of Novo Mesto in southeastern Slovenia. The entire municipality lies in the traditional region of Lower Carniola and is now included in the Southeast Slovenia Statistical Region.

References

External links
Črešnjice on Geopedia

Populated places in the City Municipality of Novo Mesto